Jayantilal Virchand Shah is an Indian politician and was the member of 9th Lok Sabha from Banaskantha. He started his political career in 1967 when he was elected to Gujarat Legislative Assembly. He was Union Minister of State for Agriculture and Co-operation in Chandra Shekhar ministry. .

References

1928 births
Year of death missing
India MPs 1989–1991
Janata Party politicians
Samajwadi Janata Party politicians
Janata Dal politicians
Bharatiya Lok Dal politicians
Gujarat MLAs 1985–1990
People from Banaskantha district
Lok Sabha members from Gujarat
Gujarat MLAs 1967–1971